General elections were held in the British Virgin Islands on 7 November 2011.  The result was a decisive victory for the opposition National Democratic Party (NDP) led by Orlando Smith over the incumbent Virgin Islands Party (VIP), led by Premier Ralph T. O'Neal.  No minor parties or independent candidates won any seats.

Background

The House of Assembly was dissolved on 13 September 2011, by the Governor, Mr William Boyd McCleary, on advice from the Premier.  However, the date of the election was not announced until 23 September 2011.

Premier Ralph O'Neal confirmed that he would lead his party at the 2011 general election, even though he would turn 78 shortly after the election, and would be 82 at the end of the term of office (if re-elected).

Second district representative, Alvin Christopher (who received the highest percentage of votes for a territorial candidate (75.9%) in the 2007 election) announced that he would run for the Virgin Islands Party.  Mr Christopher has formerly run for the VIP, the NDP and as an independent candidate.

Although the ruling Virgin Islands Party had a huge majority following the 2007 election the intervening years had been characterised by difficult economic times, and a series of natural disasters had hit the Territory damaging its infrastructure.  Both of these events led to criticism being directed towards the ruling Government.

Results
The 2011 general election was largely a complete reversal of the 2007 election.  Whereas in 2007 everything seemed to go the way of the VIP, in 2011 every closely contested seat seemed to end up falling to the NDP.  The VIP characteristically dominated their safe seats in the First, Second and Third Districts, and the NDP characteristically dominated the At-large seats, sweeping all four.  But surprise defeats for the VIP in Fifth, Sixth and Eighth Districts handed victory to the NDP.  Former Premier Ralph O'Neal managed to cling on to his seat in the Ninth District, which he had held for 40 years, by just 28 votes.

Aftermath
On 9 November 2011 Governor Boyd McCleary officially appointed Orlando Smith as the Premier under section 52(1) the constitution.  He became the third person in BVI political history to serve two non-consecutive terms of office as Chief Minister/Premier, and the fourth to win more than one general election as party leader 

On the same day the first cabinet was sworn in under Orlando Smith. In addition to serving as Premier, Smith was appointed Minister of Finance and Tourism. Kedrick Pickering was appointed Deputy Premier and Minister of Natural Resources and Labour, Myron Walwyn was appointed Minister of Education and Culture, Mark Vanterpool was appointed Minister of Communications and Works and Ronnie Skelton was appointed Minister of Health and Social Development.

Sources 
 Virgin Islands News Online - 2011 General Election
 Platinum News BVI - 2011 General Election

References

British Virgin Islands
2011 in the British Virgin Islands
Elections in the British Virgin Islands
November 2011 events in North America